The 1994 Oakland Athletics' season was the team's 27th season in Oakland, California. It was also the 94th season in franchise history. The team finished second in the American League West with a record of 51–63.

The Athletics' 1994 campaign ranks among the most unusual in franchise history. A disastrous 1993 campaign, attributable mainly to inept pitching, had tempered expectations in Oakland; while several established stars (namely Dennis Eckersley, Bob Welch, Terry Steinbach, Mark McGwire, and a recently re-signed Rickey Henderson) remained with the team in 1994, questions about the starting rotation, bullpen, and infield kept expectations low.

The Athletics belied these low expectations with a 7–5 start. The team's pitching staff continued to hemorrhage runs (allowing 79 in 12 games); the staff was bailed out, however, by their red-hot offense (which scored 93 runs over the same span). On April 17 (the day of Oakland's seventh win), the A's were 1.5 games ahead of the second-place California Angels.

The Athletics' offense soon cooled down, however. This drop in production, combined with continued pitching woes, set the stage for a monumental collapse. Between April 19 and May 29, Oakland lost 31 games in 37 tries; at the end of this span, their record stood at 13–36. The A's, then firmly in last place, trailed the division-leading Angels (who also had a sub-.500 record) by nine games. Oakland continued to lose ground over the following two weeks; at their absolute nadir, the Athletics' 19–43 record trailed the division-leading Rangers (who had since overtaken the Angels) by 12.5 games. 

The A's, instead, launched themselves back into contention with a turnaround. Over their next 22 games, the Athletics went 19–3; this surge raised their record to 38–46. Oakland's much-maligned pitching staff powered the resurgence; over the 22-game span, Athletics pitchers allowed 3.27 runs per game (while pitching six shutouts). The rest of the division struggled over the same span; as such, Oakland's 38th victory allowed it to pull within three games of the first-place Rangers. The A's cooled down in subsequent weeks; poor play from the rest of the division, however, allowed them to gain further ground. The team finished with a 51–63 record; despite being 12 games under .500, the A's were only one game behind the first-place Rangers. All four of the American League West's teams finished the strike-shortened season with losing records. This is the only such instance in MLB history.

The 1994 Players' strike ended the season (and the A's postseason hopes) entirely. While the Rangers would win their first-ever division title in 1996, the A's would have to wait until 2000 to return to the postseason.

Offseason
 November 16, 1993: Mike Aldrete was signed as a free agent by the Athletics.
December 13, 1993: Billy Taylor was signed as a free agent by the Athletics.
 December 17, 1993: Rickey Henderson was signed as a free agent by the Athletics.
 December 20, 1993: Kurt Abbott was traded by the Athletics to the Florida Marlins for Kerwin Moore.
 December 23, 1993: Dave Righetti was signed as a free agent by the Athletics.

Regular season
Despite compiling a record of 51–63 by Friday, August 12, the Athletics were only one game behind the Texas Rangers for the lead in the AL West Division. They had scored 549 runs (4.82 per game) and allowed 589 runs (5.17 per game).

The Athletics finished the strike-shortened season 28th in triples, with just 13, but they led the Majors in sacrifice flies, with 51.

Despite walking an MLB-high 510 batters, the Athletics tied the Chicago White Sox for the most shutouts pitched, with 9.

Transactions
 April 27, 1994: Dave Righetti was released by the Athletics.
 April 30, 1994: Steve Sax was signed as a free agent by the Athletics.
 May 10, 1994: Jeff Schaefer was signed as a free agent by the Athletics.
 June 2, 1994: 1994 Major League Baseball Draft
Jason Beverlin was drafted by the Athletics in the 4th round.
Tim Hudson was drafted by the Athletics in the 35th round, but did not sign.

Season standings

Record vs. opponents

Roster

Player stats

Batting

Starters by position
Note: Pos = Position; G = Games played; AB = At bats; H = Hits; Avg. = Batting average; HR = Home runs; RBI = Runs batted in

Other batters
Note: G = Games played; AB = At bats; H = Hits; Avg. = Batting average; HR = Home runs; RBI = Runs batted in

Pitching

Starting pitchers 
Note: G = Games pitched; IP = Innings pitched; W = Wins; L = Losses; ERA = Earned run average; SO = Strikeouts

Other pitchers 
Note: G = Games pitched; IP = Innings pitched; W = Wins; L = Losses; ERA = Earned run average; SO = Strikeouts

Relief pitchers 
Note: G = Games pitched; W = Wins; L = Losses; SV = Saves; ERA = Earned run average; SO = Strikeouts

Farm system 

LEAGUE CHAMPIONS: Huntsville

References

External links
 1994 Oakland Athletics team page at Baseball Reference
 1994 Oakland Athletics team page at www.baseball-almanac.com
 

Oakland Athletics seasons
Oakland Athletics
Oak